Viktorijina tajna is the sixth studio album by Bosnian recording artist Maya Berović released on July 2, 2017 through City Records. The album is recognised as a significant departure from Maya's previous work. It contains nine pop-folk songs with strong hip-hop and pop influence. The record was written and produced by Bosnian rappers Jala Brat and Buba Corelli, whose vocals are also featured in three songs.

Following the release of the lead single, "To me radi", in July 2016, Berović announced her sixth album via her social media accounts on 27 June 2017.

Track listing

Release history

References

External links
Viktrijina Tajna by Maya Berović at Discogs

2017 albums
Maya Berović albums
City Records albums